Alla Pervorukova is a retired Russian rower who won three European titles in the eight event in 1963, 1965 and 1967; she finished second in 1964 and 1966.

References

Year of birth missing (living people)
Living people
Russian female rowers
Soviet female rowers
European Rowing Championships medalists